T. nigricans may refer to:
 Tragulus nigricans, the Philippine mouse-deer, Balabac mouse Deer or pilandok, a small, nocturnal ruminant species endemic to Balabac and nearby smaller islands south-west of Palawan in the Philippines
 Trichomycterus nigricans, a catfish species in the genus Trichomycterus

See also
 Nigricans (disambiguation)